Michael Walters (born 1991) is an Australian footballer

Michael Walters may also refer to:

Michael P. Walters (born 1956), North Carolina politician
Mike Walters (born 1957), Major League Baseball pitcher
Michael Walters, Edmonton City Council councilman for Edmonton, Alberta
Michael Walters, a character in the video game Tom Clancy's Rainbow Six: Vegas
Mick Walters, English footballer

See also
Michael Walter (disambiguation)
Michael Waters (disambiguation)